Stacey Tendeter (21 June 1949 – 26 October 2008) was a British actress best known for her performance as Muriel in the 1971 film Two English Girls. Her other cinematic appearances include White Bird, Friend or Foe, and Terminal Game.

The majority of her work came in the 1970s on British television when she appeared on Elizabeth R, Dead of Night, The Pallisers, In This House of Brede and Doctor Who in the story Underworld. She has since done mostly stage theatre, having performed in The Sentence, School For Sugar and The Scandal. In 1983 she played the wife of Adam Dalgliesh in the ITV adaption of PD James' Death of an Expert Witness.

After François Truffaut died in 1984, a director's cut of Two English Girls was released to great acclaim. In particular, the addition of several important scenes featuring Stacey was praised. This is the version currently available on DVD.

Stacey died from breast cancer, having suffered from the illness for many years and been unable to work in TV, film or theatre as a result. She left behind her husband, Andy, and three children.

References

External links 

English stage actresses
English film actresses
English television actresses
1949 births
2008 deaths
Deaths from cancer in England
Deaths from breast cancer